Quercus pseudococcifera is a species of flowering plant in the beech family Fagaceae, native to the west and central Mediterranean.

Taxonomy
Quercus pseudococcifera was first described by René Louiche Desfontaines in 1799. It has often been treated as a subspecies, variety or form of Quercus coccifera.  It is placed in section Ilex.

Distribution
Quercus pseudococcifera is native to Algeria, Morocco and Tunisia in north Africa, and Portugal, Sardinia, Sicily and Spain in Europe.

References

pseudococcifera
Flora of Algeria
Flora of Morocco
Flora of Portugal
Flora of Sardinia
Flora of Sicily
Flora of Spain
Flora of Tunisia
Plants described in 1799